Hunslet R.L.F.C. is a professional rugby league club in Hunslet, South Leeds, West Yorkshire, England, who play in Betfred League 1. The club was founded in 1973 as New Hunslet, they became Hunslet in 1979 and the club were the Hunslet Hawks between 1995 and 2016.

History

1973–1996: New club
In July 1973, the original Hunslet club was wound up because no suitable new location could be found that was financially viable. The £300,000 proceeds of the sale of Parkside were distributed to shareholders.

Due to the efforts of their former Great Britain forward Geoff Gunney (MBE), local businessmen and supporters the club managed to reform as New Hunslet for the 1973–74 season and moved to the Leeds Greyhound Stadium and erected iron American football posts. The resurrected club had a new badge depicting a rising phoenix to symbolise their rebirth. In 1974, New Hunslet adopted green and white as team colours because the traditional myrtle, white and flame colours were still registered to the former Parkside-based club, and they would not release them. The stay at the greyhound stadium was cut short when the owners closed the ground and arranged to demolish everything on the site.

In 1978, coach Bill Ramsey put a lot of pressure on the RFL and finally got permission to use the traditional colours. The club reverted to Hunslet for the 1979–80 season. With the closure of the Greyhound stadium, the next ground to host Hunslet was Mount Pleasant, Batley, for two seasons, before Hunslet moved to Leeds United's Elland Road football stadium then owned by Leeds City Council. After leaving Elland Road, Hunslet had a brief spell at Bramley.

On 19 November 1995, the club, now known as Hunslet Hawks, moved to the South Leeds Stadium, only about half a mile from Parkside. On that day, Leigh were the guests at Hunslet's first home game for twenty-two years. They then narrowly missed out on promotion from Division Two in 1996. Coach Steve Ferres left to join Huddersfield and David Plange took over as player-coach.

1996–2009: Summer era
In 1997 the Hawks played in the first (and last) Challenge Cup Plate Final losing 60–14 to Hull Kingston Rovers. It was the Hawks first appearance at Wembley Stadium since 1965. Also in 1997, the Hawks were promoted to the First Division as champions.

In 1999 as a possible merger between Hunslet and Bramley was debated. In 1999 Hunslet won the Northern Ford Premiership Grand Final against Dewsbury, 12–11, at Headingley. After that game the Hawks were denied entry to Super League by the Rugby Football League who cited a document called Framing the Future as justification. This caused a number of players to leave the club and for the average attendance to fall by more than 1,200 to 800. A link-up with Leeds Rhinos saw Plange go to Headingley as Academy coach.

2004 saw the re-establishment the annual friendly against Leeds Rhinos for the Lazenby Cup, a trophy that had previously been contested between Hunslet F.C. and Leeds since 1912.

Paul March was the player/coach at Hunslet, joining midway through the 2009 season following the resignation of Graeme Hallas. March guided Hunslet to a 6th-place finish and a play-off spot in Championship 1. Hunslet travelled to Blackpool in the first week of the play-offs winning, 18–21, to set up an elimination semi-final against Oldham in which Hunslet were comfortably beaten, 54–30.

2010–present: Promotions and silverware
In 2010 Paul March led Hunslet to their first silverware for over 11 years by securing the Co-operative Championship 1 title, and subsequent survival in 2011.

In 2012, Barry Eaton took over as coach. In 2014 Hunslet won the Grand Final after extra time against Oldham, thus gaining promotion to the Championship. Barry Eaton left in late January 2016 to join Leeds Rhinos and was replaced by his assistant coach and former Hunslet Hawks player Matt Bramald. Bramald left the club at the end of the 2016 season having completed his contract. He was replaced by former Hunslet player James Coyle.

Hunslet Hawks returned to their original name of Hunslet RLFC for the 2017 season following an overwhelming fan vote in favour of their original name. Fans were then asked to choose between the clubs' original 'Rampant Lion' crest and the 'Phoenix Rising' crest adopted by the club in 1973 when the club was reformed. Fans voted 54% to 46% in favour of the lion.

Colours and crest

Hunslet play in myrtle, flame and white, with away colours mainly being white. The club's original crest was a 'Rampant Lion' but as part of a rebrand at the start of the summer era was the introduction of the Hunslet Hawks. In 2017, the club's fans voted to drop Hawks from their name and reinstate the 'Rampant Lion' crest.

Stadia

1883–1888 Woodhouse Hill

Hunslet played their first match on 6 October 1883 against Hull 'A'. A stand was built in 1884.

1888–1973: Parkside

Hunslet purchased at little cost of waste land at Hunslet Carr from the Low Moor Iron and Coal Company and had to shift 2,000 tons of rubbish to create what would become Parkside, which they moved to in 1888. Parkside's stand was burned down by vandals in 1971. Parkside was sold off to an industrial developer for around £300,000 in 1972. The last game at Parkside was on 21 April 1973 against York. Parkside was demolished and Hunslet became tenants at the Elland Road greyhound stadium.

1973–1980: Leeds Greyhound Stadium
The new Hunslet club's first ground was the Elland Road Greyhound Stadium in Beeston after they were told they could not play at Parkside. American football posts were erected to be used as goal posts.

1980–1982: Mount Pleasant

In 1982, the greyhound stadium closed and Hunslet were left homeless. For two seasons they ground-shared with Batley while they searched for a permanent home in Leeds.

1983–1995: Elland Road

In 1983, after leaving Batley, Hunslet negotiated a deal with Leeds City Council to play at Leeds United's Elland Road, which the council owned at the time.

1995–present: South Leeds Stadium

Hunslet moved into the South Leeds Stadium, Beeston, Leeds after it was built in 1995. The stadium is used to host athletics and also has a swimming pool and other facilities the club can use. The stadium has one main stand that accommodates the grounds 5,000 capacity.

2022 squad
* Announced on 13 December 2021:

2022 transfers

Gains
 

Losses

Players

Players earning international caps while at Hunslet
 Frank Davies won a cap for Wales while at Hunslet in 1978 against England
 Robert 'Iain' Higgins won caps for Scotland while at London Broncos, and Hunslet 1997…2001 1-cap + 1-cap (sub)
 Charlie Wabo won caps for Papua New Guinea while at Hunslet
 Michael Mark won caps for Papua New Guinea while at Hunslet
Neil Lowe won caps for Scotland while at Hunslet
Lee Hanlan won caps for Ireland while at Hunslet
 Arthur Clues won caps for Australia while at Wests, and won caps for Other Nationalities while at Leeds, and Hunslet
 Charlie Wabo won caps for Papua New Guinea while at Hunslet
Neil Lowe won caps for Scotland while at Hunslet
Lee Hanlan won caps for Ireland while at Hunslet

Past coaches

 Jack Walkington 1946–1960
 Fred Ward 1962–1967
 Harry Poole 1971–197?
 Bill Ramsey 1978–1979
 Paul Daley 1980–1985
 Peter Jarvis 1986–1987
 David Ward 1986–1987
 Nigel Stephenson 1988
 Jack Austin 1988
 Johnny Wolford 1988
 Paul Daley 1990–1991
 Paul Daley 1993
 Stephen Ferres 1994–1996
 David Plange 1996–2000
 Roy Sampson 2000–2006
 Mark Cass 2007
 Graeme Hallas 2008–2009
 Paul March 2010–2011
 Barry Eaton 2012–2015
 Matt Bramald 2016
 James Coyle 2016–2017
 Gary Thornton 2018–2021
 Mark Cass (interim) 2021
 Alan Kilshaw 2021–present

Seasons

Super League era

Honours
Division 2 / Championship:
Winners (1): 1999
Division 3 / League 1:
Winners (2): 2010, 2014
League 1 Shield: 
Winners: 2017

References
General
 Hawks:facts and history
Inline

External links
 Hunslet official site
 Hunslet Hawks forum on rlfans.com
 Hunslet Hawks Fans Forums – RugbyLeague.org
 Pictorial history of rugby league in Hunslet

 
Sport in Leeds
Rugby clubs established in 1973
Fan-owned football clubs
Women's rugby league teams in England
English rugby league teams